The  was an infantry division of the Imperial Japanese Army. It was formed 10 July 1945 in Changchun as a triangular division. It was a part of the 8 simultaneously created divisions batch comprising 134th,  135th, 136th, 137th, 138th, 139th, 148th and 149th divisions. The nucleus for the formation was the garrison of Changchun.

Action
During the Soviet invasion of Manchuria, the 148th division was ordered to construct fortifications and garrison Changchun, although the division was nearly unarmed and not equipped.

The 148th division was disarmed 20–22 August 1945 without seeing any action during Soviet invasion of Manchuria.

See also
 List of Japanese Infantry Divisions

Notes and references
This article incorporates material from Japanese Wikipedia page 第148師団 (日本軍), accessed 11 July 2016
 Madej, W. Victor, Japanese Armed Forces Order of Battle, 1937–1945 [2 vols], Allentown, PA: 1981.

Japanese World War II divisions
Infantry divisions of Japan
Military units and formations established in 1945
Military units and formations disestablished in 1945
1945 establishments in Japan
1945 disestablishments in Japan